A peck is a unit of dry volume.

Peck may also refer to:

 A common misspelling of 'pec' the common abbreviation for the Pectoralis major muscle
 A derogatory term for members of a race of dwarf-like people in the film Willow
 Peck the Penguin, a character from Ryan's World
 Peck (surname)

Places

United States
Peck, Idaho
Peck, Kansas
Peck, Michigan
Peck, Wisconsin

See also
 Justice Peck (disambiguation)
 Pek (disambiguation)

he:פק